Prunus rhamnoides, and also iza and mataiza, is a species of Prunus in the family Rosaceae. It is native to Mexico and Central America. It is a tree 7.5 to 15m tall. A shade tolerant species, it is considered an indicator of forest health. Local people use its timber for construction and household implements.

Notes

References

rhamnoides
Flora of Mexico
Flora of Central America
Plants described in 1915